Humphrey Hose (born 4 May 1947) is a former professional tennis player from Curaçao who represented Venezuela in the Davis Cup.

Biography
Hose was born in Curaçao and became there the tennis champion at the age of 18. He moved to Venezuela in 1965 and began representing his adopted country in Davis Cup competition.

From 1967 to 1971, Hose played collegiate tennis in the United States with the University of Corpus Christi, earning NCAA All-American selection in his final year.

Following graduation, he competed on the Grand Prix tennis circuit. He won the doubles title at the Merion Open in 1974 with Roy Barth.

Hose played a total of 16 Davis Cup ties for Venezuela, the last in 1979. He finished with a 17/26 record, with 13 of those wins in singles, one of which was over American Dick Stockton in Caracas in 1976. 

Since 1980, Hose has lived in Aruba, where he works as a tennis coach. He became captain of Aruba's Davis Cup team in 2007.

Grand Prix career finals

Doubles: 2 (1–1)

Davis Cup 

   indicates the outcome of the Davis Cup match followed by the score, date, place of event, the zonal classification and its phase, and the court surface.

References

External links
 
 
 

1947 births
Living people
Venezuelan male tennis players
Venezuelan people of Curaçao descent
Central American and Caribbean Games medalists in tennis
Central American and Caribbean Games bronze medalists for Venezuela